The Tunisia women's national under-16 and under-17 basketball team, nicknamed Les Aigles de Carthage (The Eagles of Carthage or The Carthage Eagles), is a national basketball team of Tunisia, administered by the Tunisia Basketball Federation (FTBB). 
It represents the country in international under-16 and under-17 (under age 16 and under age 17) women's basketball competitions.

Competitive record
 Champions   Runners-up   Third place   Fourth place

Red border color indicates tournament was held on home soil.

FIBA Under-17 Women's Basketball World Cup

FIBA Africa Under-16 Championship for Women

FIBA U16 Women's European Championship

See also
Tunisia women's national basketball team
Tunisia women's national under-20 basketball team
Tunisia women's national under-19 basketball team
Tunisia men's national under-17 basketball team

References

External links
 Archived records of Tunisia team participations

Basketball in Tunisia
Basketball teams in Tunisia
Women's national under-17 basketball teams
Basketball